Statistics of Úrvalsdeild in the 1942 season.

Overview
It was contested by 5 teams, and Valur won the championship. Valur's Ellert Sölvason was the top scorer with 6 goals.

League standings

Results

References

Úrvalsdeild karla (football) seasons
Iceland
Iceland
Urvalsdeild